The personification of wisdom, typically as a righteous woman, is a motif found in religious and philosophical texts, most notably in the Book of Proverbs in the Hebrew Bible and other Jewish and Christian texts.

The Greek Septuagint, and both the Qumran and Masada Hebrew versions of Ben Sira conclude with a first-person character speaking in Wisdom's voice as in the Book of Proverbs, though it is not certain that this was not appended to Ben Sira from another work. A less clear personification of Wisdom is also found in the Cave 11 Psalm Scroll.

Wisdom literature is a genre of literature common in the ancient Near East. This genre is characterized by sayings of wisdom intended to teach about divinity and about virtue. The key principle of wisdom literature is that while techniques of traditional story-telling are used, books also presume to offer insight and wisdom about nature and reality.

Old Testament and Jewish texts

The Sapiential Books or "Books of Wisdom" is a term used in biblical studies to refer to a subset of the books of the Jewish Bible in the Septuagint version. There are seven of these books, namely the books of Job, Psalms, Proverbs, Ecclesiastes, the Book of Wisdom, the Song of Songs (Song of Solomon), and Sirach. Not all the Psalms are usually regarded as belonging to the Wisdom tradition.

In Judaism, the Books of Wisdom are regarded as part of the Ketuvim or "Writings". In Christianity, Job, Psalms, Proverbs and Ecclesiastes are included in the Old Testament by all traditions, while Wisdom, Song of Songs and Sirach are regarded in some traditions as deuterocanonical.

Sapiential books are in the broad tradition of wisdom literature that was found widely in the Ancient Near East, and includes writings from many religions other than Judaism.

Septuagint

The Greek noun sophia is the translation of "wisdom" in the Greek Septuagint for Hebrew  . Wisdom is a central topic in the "sapiential" books, i.e. Proverbs, Psalms, Song of Songs, Ecclesiastes, Book of Wisdom, Wisdom of Sirach, and to some extent Baruch (the last three are Apocryphal / Deuterocanonical books of the Old Testament.)

Philo and the Logos

Philo, a Hellenised Jew writing in Alexandria, attempted to harmonise Platonic philosophy and Jewish scripture. Also influenced by Stoic philosophical concepts, he used the Greek term logos, "word," for the role and function of Wisdom, a concept later adapted by the author of the Gospel of John in the opening verses and applied to Jesus Christ as the eternal Word (Logos) of God the Father.

Jesus
According to Perkins, in early Gnosticism (1st–2nd century CE) a wisdom tradition developed, in which Jesus' sayings were interpreted as pointers to an esoteric wisdom, in which the soul could be divinized through identification with wisdom.

Perkins further said that a mythical story developed in early Gnosticism about the descent of a heavenly creature to reveal the Divine world as the true home of human beings. Jewish Christianity saw the Messiah, or Christ, as "an eternal aspect of God's hidden nature, his "spirit" and "truth," who revealed himself throughout sacred history."

References

Sources

 

Book of Proverbs
Narrative techniques
Personifications